Smar Jbeil (also known as "Asmar Jbeil" or "Samar Jbeil") is a village located in the Batroun District in the North Governorate of Lebanon. It is located on a hill facing the Mediterranean Sea at 500 m elevation. It is one of the oldest villages in Lebanon.

Geography 
 North Lebanon Governorate
 Batroun District
 Elevation: 500m
 Distance from Beirut: 53 km
 Distance from Tripoli:43 km
 Distance from Batroun:10 km

Etymology 
Smar could be of Aramaic origin: Shemreho ܫܡܪܚܐ which means the "guardian" or the "protector"; Jbeil stands for Byblos, being the nearby coastal famous city. Given its strategic location on an open hillside, the village and its fort could have served as an advanced position for the defense of Jbeil from its northern side.

Others refer the name to the Phoenician roots: Sym meaning "tomb" and Mar meaning lord. In this case, the village could have served as a burial ground for the kings of Jbeil (which is the oldest Phoenician city located at 20 km at the southwest of Smar Jbeil).

History 
Smar Jbeil is one of the oldest villages in Lebanon according to Henri Lammens in his book Tasrīḥ al-abṣār fī mā yaḥtawī Lubnān min al-āthār. It has a very old castle at the western entrance of the village built on a strategic hill, showing from its western side, the Mediterranean coast from Byblos to Tripoli, and from its eastern side the mountains of Lebanon specially the famous Cedars of God mountain near Bsharri. 

The Roman troops conquered the village from its northern side under the leadership of Pompey the Great, probably during his Eastern campaign in 63 BC. Up till today, we can see some Roman statues in the castle .

Many Maronites took refuge in Smar Jbeil after persecution in the Syrian hinterland at the hands of the Byzantine Empire. They took control of the castle where they installed their Patriarch. The first Patriarch Saint John Maron (685 CE) lived in Smar Jbeil castle before moving to Kfarhay. .

The Abbasid caliphate invaded the village after the eventual defeat of the Byzantine Empire in the ninth century and controlled the village until the Crusaders attacked them from the Mediterranean Sea. The Crusaders demolished the old castle and built a new one called Chateau Fort (Strong Castle) because of its strategic location. They built a new church on the south eastern side of the castle. In addition, they remodeled the old church of Saint Nohra (Nuhro meaning the light in Syriac language), which was itself built on the ruins of an old Roman temple. The church still have a Crusader cross on its western entrance.

After the Crusades, the village entered under the Mamluks rule in the 13th century. The Mamluks were defeated in 1516 CE by the Ottomans. The Ottomans under the Sultan Selim I invaded the region and built a mosque on the eastern side of the castle. The village was repopulated by Maronite peasants in the following century and the mosque was turned into a residence place.

Monuments

The castle 
The castle was built in the center of the village, on a hill showing the entire neighborhood. While it may rest on pre-Roman foundations, its existing structure dates to the period of the Crusades, when the area was part of the County of Tripoli. 
The Castle had a main tower controlling the coast between Jbeil and Batrun. In his book Tarikh al-Azminah, the Patriarch Estephan El Douaihy (1670–1704) explains how the main castle tower was demolished:Sunday, November 25th 1630, at 3:00AM a huge earthquake hit the castle and demolished the center tower from its four corners. It demolished also all what was in the lower basement.
The castle has many wells built in the rocks. It has also many tunnels connecting the castle to the neighboring valleys.

Churches 
The old church of Saint Bassil and Nohra stands in the center of the village. It is constructed of mixed elements  and some later material, notably from medieval times. The church was renovated over the history first by the Crusades and after by the Maronites. The last renovation was done in the late 1800 where a rock chain was added to the main entrance.
Saint Nohra is a priest form Manhour in Egypt who came to preach in Batroun in the early centuries of Christianity. When he reached the city, he was asked by its king to deny Jesus Christ; he refused immediately and kept preaching in Jesus Christ in the entire city. He was captured (by the king), killed and buried in one of the castle's wells. The well became since then, a shrine for all Christian believers. Saint Nohra is known as the intercessor of sight, he had a Sister named Takla (different from Saint Takla, follower of Saint Paul) and a brother named Qanoon.

Close to Saint Nohra, an old little ruined chapel with a single nave could be seen, Our Lady of Gifts church. It is believed that this church is older than Saint Nohra's church.

Less than 500 meters from Saint Bassil and Nohra church one cand find Saint Takla church, which is a smaller yet very old church venerated by the parish until our days.
.

Prominent personalities

Patriarchs 
Smar Jbeil is the homeland of three Maronite Patriarchs Michael Rizzi (1567–1581), Sarkis Rizzi (1581–1596) and Joseph Rizzi (1596–1608). They were born in Bkoufa and they were known as Al-Samrani's in relation to Smar Jbeil, their homeland and origins. Under Patriarch Michael Rizzi, the monastery of Saint Anthony the Great in Qozhaya (From Aramaic: the living Treasure) knew a revival, and later in 1610 the same monastery received the first printing press in the Middle East printing in Aramaic language.

Families 
Smar Jbeil is known to be the origin of the Bassil family. Most of the families in the village are related somehow to the Bassil family it represents 85 to 90% of the residents. The Jemayel family came to Smar Jbeil in the 1880s from Bekfaya, after the Mount Lebanon tragic events at that time. The Fares family came to Smar Jbeil in the 1930s from Ram. Khalife family represent as well one of the oldest and biggest families in Smar Jbeil.

References

External links
Smar Jbeil,  Localiban

Populated places in the North Governorate
Batroun District